The following is an alphabetical list of members of the United States House of Representatives from the state of Kansas.  For chronological tables of members of both houses of the United States Congress from the state (through the present day), see United States congressional delegations from Kansas.  The list of names should be complete (as of January 3, 2021), but other data may be incomplete. It includes members who have represented both the state and the territory, both past and present.

Current members

Updated January 2021.

 : Tracey Mann (R) (since 2021)
 : Jake LaTurner (R) (since 2021)
 : Sharice Davids (D) (since 2019)
 : Ron Estes (R) (since 2017)

List of members and delegates

See also

List of United States senators from Kansas
United States congressional delegations from Kansas
Kansas's congressional districts

Notes 

+United States representatives
Kansas